Valencia Hall, in Santa Cruz County, California near Aptos, California, was built around 1884 by F.A. Hihn.  It was listed on the National Register of Historic Places in 1984.
  
It is a  structure built entirely of redwood.  It was built on Valencia Creek as a meeting place and community center for a community planned to serve millhands and their families.

References

		
National Register of Historic Places in Santa Cruz County, California
Victorian architecture in California
Buildings and structures completed in 1884